Sattur is an assembly constituency located in Virudhunagar district in Tamil Nadu. It falls under Virudhunagar Lok Sabha Constituency. The constituency served as the Chief Minister's constituency in the years 1957 and 1962 respectively which was won by then Chief Minister K.Kamaraj. It is one of the 234 State Legislative Assembly Constituencies in Tamil Nadu, in India.

The Mukkulathor (Maravar+Agamudaiyar+Kallar) is the biggest community in this constituency with around 28% population.

The population of other communities are: 24% all kinds of Naidu, 20% Devendrakula Velalar, 20% Reddy, 5% Nadar, 1% Pillaimar, 1% Konar and 1% Saliyar.

In the 2021 election, the DMK party's allainace party MDMK's Kamma Naidu candidate won the election against the Maravar candidate of AIADMK.

Madras State assembly

Tamil Nadu assembly

Election Results

2021

2019 By-election

2016

2011

2006

2001

1996

1991

1989

1984

1980

1977

1971

1967

1962

1957

1952

References 

 

Assembly constituencies of Tamil Nadu
Virudhunagar district